Manhattan Heartbeat is a 1940 American drama film directed by David Burton and written by Clark Andrews, Harold Buchman, Jack Jungmeyer and Edith Skouras. It is based on the 1928 novel Bad Girl by Viña Delmar. The film stars Robert Sterling, Virginia Gilmore, Joan Davis, Edmund MacDonald, Don Beddoe and Paul Harvey. The film was released on July 12, 1940, by 20th Century Fox.

Plot
Johnny Farrell is an airplane mechanic who has to test aircraft in order to make some extra money to support his relationship.

Cast 
Robert Sterling as Johnny Farrell
Virginia Gilmore as Dottie Haley
Joan Davis as Edna Higgins
Edmund MacDonald as Spike
Don Beddoe as Preston
Paul Harvey as Dr. Bentley
Irving Bacon as Sweeney
Mary Carr as Grandma in Music Store
Ann Doran as Shop Girl's Friend
James Flavin as Truck Driver
Edgar Dearing as Policeman
Jan Duggan as Wife
Harry Tyler as Husband
Steve Pendleton as Tony
Edward Earle as Official
Murray Alper as Mechanic
Dick Winslow as Bus Driver
George Reed as Porter
Louise Lorimer as Nurse
Ruth Warren as Nurse
Emmett Vogan as Doctor
Lenita Lane as Bentley's Nurse

References

External links
 

1940 films
20th Century Fox films
American drama films
1940 drama films
Films directed by David Burton
Films based on works by Viña Delmar
American black-and-white films
1940s English-language films
1940s American films